Tunney is a town located along the Albany Highway between Kojonup and Cranbrook, in the Shire of Broomehill-Tambellup in the Great Southern region of Western Australia.

The district was first settled in the 1850s, and by 1909 a new settler named J.A. Atcheson wrote to the government asking for assistance with establishing a school and other facilities, and for a townsite to be declared. Following inspection some land near Slab Hut Gully was set aside for a townsite, which was locally known as Paul Valley. Lots were surveyed in 1910, and the Aboriginal name of Tulungup (from Teulungup) was proposed, but rejected by the Minister of Lands. The local residents then unanimously supported the name Tunney. The Minister of Lands then chose the name Nymbupp, but after stiff opposition from the locals eventually Tunney was used. The townsite was gazetted in 1912.

The town was also known as Slab Hut.

The name Tunney comes from the oldest local resident in the area at the time, James Tunney, who owned lands around the area in the 1880s. He was the son of Sergeant John Tunney who was an enrolled Pensioner Guard and had settled in the area in the 1860s.
 
An agricultural hall was opened in the town in 1913 by Mr A.E. Piesse, in front of a large crowd, including Tunney. Tunney was presented with a set of pipes and his wife received a tea service from Piesse in recognition of all their contributions to the community, including the use of their house for town meetings.

The roadhouse was destroyed by fire on 28 May 2017.

References 

Towns in Western Australia
Shire of Broomehill-Tambellup